Robert Harold (Robin) Stokes FAA (1918–2016) was an Australian chemist and Foundation Professor of Chemistry at the University of New England, from 1955 to 1979. His research interests included solution thermodynamics and electrolytes.

Stokes was born on 24 December 1918 at Southsea in England, and the family moved to New Zealand in the 1920s. Stokes was educated at Auckland Grammar School and Auckland University College, where his studies were interrupted by the war, (BSc 1938, MSc (hons) 1940, DSc 1949) and University of Cambridge (PhD 1950).

In 1942 he married Jean Wilson and in 1946 he accepted a position at the University of Western Australia.

Honours, awards and prizes
1957 Fellow of the Australian Academy of Science (F.A.A.)
Fellow of the Royal Society of Chemistry (F.R.S.C.)
Fellow of the Royal Australian Chemical Institute (F.R.A.C.I.)
1940, Sir George Fowlds Medal, Auckland University College
1946, Rennie Medal, Australian Chemical Institute
1946, Meldola Medal, Institute of Chemistry
1953, H.G. Smith Medal, Australian Chemical Institute
1977, Queen's Jubilee Medal
1980, R.H. Stokes Medal, Electrochemistry Division, Royal Australian Chemical Institute (Inaugural award)
1981, R.A. Robinson Memorial Medal, Faraday Division, Royal Society of Chemistry (Inaugural award)
2001, Centenary Medal

References

1918 births
2016 deaths
Australian chemists
Fellows of the Australian Academy of Science
Academic staff of the University of New England (Australia)
University of Auckland alumni
Alumni of the University of Cambridge
Academic staff of the University of Western Australia
People from Southsea